Sanisvara Nethaji Rayer s/o Rajaji Rayer (born 11 June 1971) is a Malaysian politician and lawyer. He is also a member of Democratic Action Party (DAP), a component party in the Pakatan Harapan (PH) opposition coalition. He has served as Member of Parliament (MP) for Jelutong since May 2018. He served as Member of the Penang State Legislative Assembly (MLA) for Seri Delima from March 2008 to May 2018.

Politics 
Rayer's political career began in 1988 after a short stint working for Karpal Singh for his general election campaign. Subsequently, he joined Democratic Action Party (DAP) and went on to contest and be elected twice as the state assemblyman for Seri Delima in 2008 and 2013 general elections. In the 2018 general election, Rayer contested the Jelutong parliamentary seat and was elected as a member of parliament.

Criticism of Najib Razak
On 10 May 2019, Rayer urged former prime minister Najib Razak to show some remorse for what happened while he was prime minister instead of going around calling himself “Bossku”.

On 17 November 2021, Rayer claimed that there was a video on social media allegedly showing Najib signing his autograph on a motorcycle while campaigning in the state polls. He offered to provide the video to Khairy, urging that action be taken against Najib for repeatedly flouting standard operating procedures (SOP).

During the Debate on Budget 2022 at the Committee Stage, Rayer had asked Finance Minister Tengku Zafrul Aziz why Najib has yet to be blacklisted by the Inland Revenue Board (IRB) and allowed to travel to Singapore despite the outstanding tax arrears owed to the government. Rayer was ejected from the Dewan Rakyat for ignoring instructions from deputy speaker Rashid Hasnon.

On 2 March 2022, Rayer has been ejected from the Dewan Rakyat after he repeatedly interjected Najib during the latter’s debate of the royal address.

Legal career 
Rayer was admitted to the Malaysian bar in 1995 after completing his pupillage in the chambers of Karpal Singh & Co. Currently, he has his own law firm, R. Nethaji Rayer & Co. in Georgetown, Penang.

Controversy

"UMNO celaka" remarks 
Rayer drew flak from UMNO-BN supporters for his controversial "UMNO celaka" (damned UMNO) remarks referring to three assemblymen who alleged that DAP instigated the May 1969 riot in a state assembly sitting in Penang State Legislative Assembly. Following his remark, a protest was staged by Penang Perkasa Youth and several Penang UMNO members in front of the state assembly hall. They stormed into the state assembly hall by crashing through the gates of the building. They have also demanded apology from R.S.N. Rayer. However, Rayer refused to apologise.

Rayer was arrested in a sedition dragnet for his "UMNO celaka" remark under the Sedition Act and was charged on 27 August 2014. However, the Sessions Court acquitted and discharged R.S.N. Rayer. The court held that the words that Rayer had used in reference to UMNO did not amount to sedition as alleged.

TV3 Broadcast License
On 11 May 2018, just days after being elected a Member of Parliament of Jelutong on 9 May 2018, Rayer again drew widespread criticism, this time from ordinary Malaysian citizens, for posting a comment on Facebook, that TV3, a Malaysian TV network, should have its broadcast license revoked. This comment was in blatant contradiction to Pakatan Harapan's election manifesto which specifically promises to guarantee media freedom, and was swiftly renounced by Pakatan Harapan.

'Kepala Bapak' remarks
On 5 August 2018, DAP's RSN Rayer, sparked controversy in the Dewan Rakyat when he used the insult ‘kepala bapak’ during the sitting. He used the phrase when his attempt to raise an additional question was interrupted by Datuk Seri Hamzah Zainudin. Hamzah had criticised Rayer for trying to ask Deputy International Trade and Industry Minister Dr Ong Kian Ming whether the 1Malaysia Development Bhd (1MDB) issue had triggered outflow of foreign investments from Malaysia.

Rayer had previously used the insult during another Parliamentary sitting. On that meeting, he was raising an additional request to the Deputy Home Affairs Minister 
Azis Jamman, over the poor conditions spreading within police barracks in Penang. He then criticized on how the previous Barisan Nasional government failed to assist in upgrading those damaged or poorly built police barracks, pointing out that their reason of not doing so as a result of not having the enough financial resources is pointless as former Prime Minister Najib Razak's wife, Rosmah Mansor, was able to freely import jewelries into the country without even paying GST.

He then uttered the word right before assuming his seat and this caused a stir between him two Barisan Nasional MPs, Mahdzir Khalid and Noh Omar, who were ordering him to withdraw the word. This was eventually settled when Deputy Speaker, Nga Kor Ming
ordered Rayer to retract.

Election results

See also
 Seri Delima (state constituency)
 Jelutong (federal constituency)
 List of Malaysian politicians of Indian origin

References

External links
 RSN Rayer blog

1971 births
Living people
People from Kedah
Malaysian Hindus
20th-century Malaysian lawyers
Malaysian politicians of Indian descent
Democratic Action Party (Malaysia) politicians
Members of the Dewan Rakyat
Members of the Penang State Legislative Assembly
Alumni of the University of London
21st-century Malaysian politicians
21st-century Malaysian lawyers